Ambato is a department of Catamarca Province in Argentina.

External links
 Ambato Webpage (Spanish)

Departments of Catamarca Province